EIHN (Everything Is Healing Nicely) is an album by Frank Zappa, posthumously released through the Zappa Family Trust in December 1999. It features recordings made with the Ensemble Modern in preparation for The Yellow Shark (1993).  The recording features violinist L. Shankar on "Roland's Big Event/Strat Vindaloo".

Track listing
All tracks written, composed and arranged by Frank Zappa.

References

External links
Lyrics and details
Release history

1999 albums
Frank Zappa albums
Albums published posthumously